Heart of the Storm is a 2004 American made-for-television action thriller drama film directed by Charles Wilkinson, starring Melissa Gilbert and Tom Cavanagh. The film originally aired on the Lifetime cable network on November 22, 2004.

Plot
The story focuses on a prison break that occurs during a hurricane. Three convicts – Juke, Tad and their leader Simpson – seek refuge in a family's small house and decide to hold them captive. The family begins to get along with the escaped prisoners until Tad and Simpson get into a fight. Simpson ends up shooting Tad, incapacitating him. When the father of the family comes home, he is also shot by Simpson. Juke tries to help the family escape Simpson's treachery, only to be wounded by a gunshot as well. The group decides to ignite hairspray with fire in an attempt to kill Simpson. Simpson survives the attack but has his face severely injured in the process, resulting in him tumbling over a staircase balcony to his death.

Cast
Melissa Gilbert as Cassie Broadbeck
Tom Cavanagh as Simpson
Brian Wimmer as Wayne Broadbeck
Ritchie Montgomery as Tad
Marcus Lyle Brown as Juke
Azure Parsons as Hayley Broadbeck (credited as Azure Dawn)
CiCi Hedgpeth as Nicole

External links
 

2004 television films
2004 films
2004 thriller drama films
2004 action thriller films
American action thriller films
American thriller drama films
Lifetime (TV network) films
American drama television films
2000s English-language films
2000s American films